The 1922 Oregon Agricultural Aggies football team represented Oregon Agricultural College (now known as Oregon State University) in the Pacific Coast Conference (PCC) during the 1922 college football season.  In their third season under head coach R. B. Rutherford, the Beavers compiled a 3–4 record (1–3 against PCC opponents), finished in a tie for fifth place in the PCC, and outscored their opponents, 44 to 42. Fullback Gap Powell was the team captain. The team played its home games at Bell Field in Corvallis, Oregon.

Schedule

References

Oregon Agricultural
Oregon State Beavers football seasons
Oregon Agricultural Aggies football